Claughton is a suburb of Birkenhead, Wirral, Merseyside, England.  It contains 25 buildings that are recorded in the National Heritage List for England as designated listed buildings, all of which are listed at Grade II.  This grade is the lowest of the three gradings given to listed buildings and is applied to "buildings of national importance and special interest".  The suburb is entirely residential, and was initially laid out for Sir William Jackson by Charles Reed in the 1840s and 1850s.  Most of the listed buildings are houses from this development.  The other listed buildings include a church, an art gallery and museum, a school (originally a house), and two pillar boxes.

References

Citations

Sources

Listed buildings in Merseyside
Lists of listed buildings in Merseyside